Greenvale Reservoir is an off-stream water storage dam in northern Melbourne, Victoria, Australia. The dam was opened 18 April 1973 and is now managed by Melbourne Water.

It is situated in the upper Yuroke Creek catchment, the major tributary of the Moonee Ponds Creek. It is in the north of the suburb of Greenvale and to the west of Roxburgh Park. 

The Greenvale Reservoir Park contains picnic tables, a playground and barbecues, and is managed by Parks Victoria. It lies to the south and west of the dam.

References

External links
Greenvale Reservoir Park, Parks Victoria
Greenvale Reservoir, Fact Sheet from Melbourne Water

Reservoirs in Victoria (Australia)
Melbourne Water catchment
Rivers of Greater Melbourne (region)
Parks in Victoria (Australia)
1973 establishments in Australia
City of Hume